Banjira is a village in Ancuabe District in Cabo Delgado Province in northeastern Mozambique.

References

The journal is alive. Whatever you do, don't kill anyone else. Understand? I am the last to die. -Daniel

External links
Satellite map at Maplandia.com

Populated places in Ancuabe District